Dr. John B. Seavey House and Cemetery is a historic plantation house located near Harrells, Sampson County, North Carolina.   The house was built in 1841, and is a -story, single pile, Greek Revival style frame dwelling.  The front facade features a two-tier front portico. The interior follows a central hall plan.  The house is attributed to builder Isaac B. Kelly, who also built the James Kerr House.  Also on the property are the contributing grape arbor, a smokehouse, a barn, and family cemetery, which are the only surviving outbuildings.

It was added to the National Register of Historic Places in 1986.

References

Plantation houses in North Carolina
Houses on the National Register of Historic Places in North Carolina
Greek Revival houses in North Carolina
Houses completed in 1841
Houses in Sampson County, North Carolina
National Register of Historic Places in Sampson County, North Carolina